James Waddey "J.W." Clark (December 8, 1877 – February 24, 1939) was a justice of the Oklahoma Supreme Court from 1925 to 1933. He was born in Allisona, Williamson County, Tennessee to Joseph Poindexter and Cora Belle Waddey. After finishing public school, James became a traveling salesman, then went into the mercantile business, and finally went into business for himself. He took a course in law in 1907 and 1908, then enrolled in Cumberland University  (Lebanon, Tennessee) in 1909. By 1910, he had opened a law practice and won election to the Oklahoma legislature. In 1912, he was elected County Attorney for Atoka County, Oklahoma and was reelected after his first two-year term expired. In 1917, he returned to private law practice in Atoka, where he remained until he won election to the Oklahoma Supreme Court in 1924, filling a vacancy and taking office in 1925. He was reelected for a full 6-year term in 1926.

In 1929, the Oklahoma Legislature attempted to impeach Clark, with the Oklahoma House of Representatives voting out eleven impeachment charges against Clark alleging corruption; however, he was acquitted by one vote in the Oklahoma Senate, and served out the remainder of his term. After returning to private practice for a time, Clark again ran for a seat on the court in 1938, but was not elected.

Personal and family life 
Justice Clark married Anna Paullin in Durant, Oklahoma on May 1, 1917. They had four children: Ann Virginia (b. September 27, 1917); Jim (b. November 6, 1920); Mary Louise (b. October 1, 1924); John Marshall (b. October 12, 1926).

Clark died in Denison, Texas, where he had been hospitalized for a kidney ailment.

Notes

References

Justices of the Oklahoma Supreme Court
1877 births
1939 deaths
People from Atoka, Oklahoma
Politicians from Oklahoma City
Cumberland University alumni
People from Williamson County, Tennessee